The Fifth Federal Electoral District of Yucatán (V Distrito Electoral Federal de Yucatán)
is one of the 300 Electoral Districts into which Mexico is divided for the purpose of elections to the federal Chamber of Deputies and one of five such districts in the state of Yucatán.

It elects one deputy to the lower house of Congress for each three-year legislative period, by means of the first past the post system.

District territory
Under the 2005 districting scheme, the district covers the municipalities in the west and south-west of the state.

The district's head town (cabecera distrital), where results from individual polling stations are gathered together and collated, is the city of Ticul.

Previous districting schemes

1996–2005 district
Between 1996 and 2005, Yucatán's Fifth District covered a similar territory as under the 2005 scheme, but with a larger slice of the south of the state.

Deputies returned to Congress from this district

LI Legislature
 1979–1982:
LII Legislature
 1982–1985:
LIII Legislature
 1985–1988:
LIV Legislature
 1988–1991:
LV Legislature
 1991–1994:
LVI Legislature
 1994–1997:
LVII Legislature
 1997–2000: Carlos Sobrino Sierra (PRI)
LVIII Legislature
 2000–2003: Rosa Elena Baduy Isaac (PRI)
LIX Legislature
 2003–2006: Ángel Canul Pacab (PRI)
LX Legislature
 2006–2009: Gerardo Escaroz Soler (PAN)

References and notes

Federal electoral districts of Mexico
Geography of Yucatán